Sympathy Sessions is the first compilation album released by the Oblivians. It was released on April 5, 1996 by Sympathy for the Record Industry. The album is a collection of two prior 10-inch releases, Never Enough and Six of the Best, as well as four additional single sides, all of which were recorded for and released by the label Sympathy for the Record Industry, hence the title.

Track listing
 Can't Last Another Night  (Oblivians) - 1:51 
 Happy Blues  (Oblivians) - 3:06 
 Never Enough  (Oblivians) - 1:55 
 Feel Real Good  (Oblivians) - 2:20 
 I'm Not a Sicko, There's a Plate in My Head  (Oblivians) - 1:58 
 Five Hour Man  (Oblivians) - 1:56 
 Shut My Mouth  (Oblivians) - 1:57 
 Show Me What You Like  (Oblivians) - 3:39 
 Clones  (Oblivians) - 1:42 
 No Time  (Oblivians) - 2:02 
 What Rock'n'roll Is All About  (Oblivians) - 1:38 
 Memphis Creep  (Oblivians) - 2:18 
 Something for Nothing  (Oblivians) - 1:47 
 Big Black Hole  (Oblivians) - 2:44 
 Can't Afford You  (Oblivians) - 2:15 
 Kick Your Ass  (Oblivians) - 1:52 
 No Butter for My Bread  (Oblivians) - 1:50 
 Show Me Again  (Oblivians) - 3:42

Credits
 Oblivians - Main Performer
 Jack Oblivian - Guitar, Drums, Vocals
 Greg Oblivian - Guitar, Drums, Vocals
 Eric Oblivian - Guitar, Vocals, Drums
 Doug Easley - Engineer
 Davis McCain - Engineer

External links
 Sympathy Sessions. "www.allmusic.com". 1997-2007 ARTISTdirect, Inc. Accessed July 10, 2007.

References

1996 albums
Oblivians albums
Sympathy for the Record Industry albums